The 2019 Engie Open Andrézieux-Bouthéon 42 was a professional tennis tournament played on indoor hard courts. It was the ninth edition of the tournament which was part of the 2019 ITF Women's World Tennis Tour. It took place in Andrézieux-Bouthéon, France between 21 and 27 January 2019.

Women's singles main-draw entrants

Seeds

 1 Rankings are as of 14 January 2019.

Other entrants
The following players received wildcards into the singles main draw:
  Tessah Andrianjafitrimo
  Clara Burel
  Julie Gervais
  Polona Hercog

The following players received entry from the qualifying draw:
  Audrey Albié
  Cristina Bucșa
  Gaëlle Desperrier
  Federica Di Sarra
  Lina Gjorcheska
  Maria Sanchez

Champions

Singles

 Rebecca Šramková def.  Audrey Albié, 6–2, 6–7(4–7), 6–2

Doubles

 Cornelia Lister /  Renata Voráčová def.  Andreea Mitu /  Elena-Gabriela Ruse, 6–1, 6–2

References

External links
 2019 Engie Open Andrézieux-Bouthéon 42 at ITFtennis.com
 Official website

2019 ITF Women's World Tennis Tour
2019 in French tennis
Open Andrézieux-Bouthéon 42